The Other Sides is a compilation album by English singer-songwriter Kate Bush. Released in March 2019, the set contained a selection of 12" mixes and B-sides as well as a selection of cover versions. Released as part of Bush’s definitive remastering project in 2018, the set was originally included in the Remastered Part II box set, before receiving a separate release in March 2019.

The Other Sides charted at number 18 in the UK.

There are some notable omissions to the rarities and B-sides in the set, including "The Empty Bullring" (B-side to "Breathing"), "Not This Time" (B-side to "The Big Sky"), "Ken" and "The Confrontation" (B-sides to "Love and Anger") as well as single versions of some tracks, instrumental versions, and extended/alternate mixes of "Rubberband Girl", "Eat the Music", "The Red Shoes" and "December Will Be Magic Again".

Reception 
Rolling Stone magazine rated The Other Sides 4 out of 5 stars, stating "most of the tracks feel as contemporary as they ever did; maybe more so." Classic Pop magazine rated the set 9/10, stating "it's hard to believe these gems were mere flip-sides".

Track listing 
All tracks remastered in 2018.

Charts

References 

2019 compilation albums
B-side compilation albums
Kate Bush albums